Condit Glacier is a glacier at the east side of Cathedral Rocks, flowing north into the Ferrar Glacier of Victoria Land. It was charted by the British Antarctic Expedition, 1910–13, under Robert Falcon Scott, and named by the Advisory Committee on Antarctic Names in 1964 for Lieutenant John C. Condit, U.S. Navy, chaplain with the winter party of 1956 at the Naval Air Facility on McMurdo Sound.

References
 

Glaciers of Victoria Land
Scott Coast